Halvor Moxnes Landsem (4 March 1913 – 6 August 1977) was a Norwegian politician for the Conservative Party.

He served as a deputy representative to the Parliament of Norway from Bergen during the terms 1954–1957 and 1958–1961. In total he met during 56 days of parliamentary session.

References

1913 births
1977 deaths
Deputy members of the Storting
Conservative Party (Norway) politicians
Politicians from Bergen